Marcus Ray Cassel (January 6, 1983 – November 17, 2006) was an American football player, who played cornerback at UCLA. He died as a result of a car crash.

References

1983 births
2006 deaths
American football cornerbacks
Players of American football from Long Beach, California
UCLA Bruins football players
Road incident deaths in California